December 20 - Eastern Orthodox liturgical calendar - December 22

All fixed commemorations below celebrated on January 3 by Orthodox Churches on the Old Calendar.

For December 21st, Orthodox Churches on the Old Calendar commemorate the Saints listed on December 8.

Feasts
 Forefeast of the Nativity of Christ.

Saints
 Martyr Theomistocles of Myra in Lycia (251)
 Virgin- martyr Juliana of Nicomedia, and with her 500 men by the sword, and 130 women by beheading. (304)
 Venerable Macarius the Faster, Abbot of Khakhuli Monastery (c. 1034)

Pre-Schism Western saints
 Saint Honoratus of Toulouse, born in Spain, he succeeded St Saturninus as Bishop of Toulouse in France (3rd century)
 Saint Severinus of Trier, Bishop of Trier in Germany (c. 300)
 Martyrs John and Festus, martyrs honoured in Tuscany in Italy.
 Saint Baudacarius, A monk at Bobbio Abbey in the north of Italy (650)
 Saint Beornwald of Bampton (Bernwald), a righteous priest in Bampton in Oxfordshire in England (10th century)
 Saint John Vincent, born in Ravenna, he became a monk at St. Michael in Chiusa, then a hermit on Monte Caprario, finally he became Bishop nearby (1012)

Post-Schism Orthodox saints
 Saint Peter of Kiev, Metropolitan of Kiev and Moscow, Wonderworker of All Russia (1326)
 Saint Juliana, Princess of Vyazma (Novotorzhok) (1406)
 Blessed Procopius of Vyatka, Fool-for-Christ (1627)
 Saint Philaret (Theodosius in schema), Metropolitan of Kiev (1857)

New martyrs and confessors
 New Hieromartyr Michael Kiselev, Priest, at Perm (1918)
 New Hieromartyr Sergius, Deacon (1937)
 New Hieromartyr Nicetas (Pribytkov), Bishop of Belev (Belevsk) (1937)
 New Hieromartyr Leontius, Deacon (1940)

Other commemorations
 Repose of Blessed Peter “the Nose,” of Kama (c. 1938)
 Repose of Schemamonk Michael of Harbin (1939)
 Finding of the relics (1950) of New Monk-martyr Ephraim of Nea Makri (1426)
 Repose of Mother Stavritsa the Missionary, missionary in Kenya (2000)

Icon gallery

Notes

References

Sources
 December 21/January 3. Orthodox Calendar (PRAVOSLAVIE.RU).
 January 3 / December 21. HOLY TRINITY RUSSIAN ORTHODOX CHURCH (A parish of the Patriarchate of Moscow).
 December 21. OCA - The Lives of the Saints.
 The Autonomous Orthodox Metropolia of Western Europe and the Americas (ROCOR). St. Hilarion Calendar of Saints for the year of our Lord 2004. St. Hilarion Press (Austin, TX). p. 1.
 December 21. Latin Saints of the Orthodox Patriarchate of Rome.
 The Roman Martyrology. Transl. by the Archbishop of Baltimore. Last Edition, According to the Copy Printed at Rome in 1914. Revised Edition, with the Imprimatur of His Eminence Cardinal Gibbons. Baltimore: John Murphy Company, 1916.
Greek Sources
 Great Synaxaristes:  21 ΔΕΚΕΜΒΡΙΟΥ. ΜΕΓΑΣ ΣΥΝΑΞΑΡΙΣΤΗΣ.
  Συναξαριστής. 21 Δεκεμβρίου. ECCLESIA.GR. (H ΕΚΚΛΗΣΙΑ ΤΗΣ ΕΛΛΑΔΟΣ). 
Russian Sources
  3 января (21 декабря). Православная Энциклопедия под редакцией Патриарха Московского и всея Руси Кирилла (электронная версия). (Orthodox Encyclopedia - Pravenc.ru).
  21 декабря (ст.ст.) 3 января 2013 (нов. ст.). Русская Православная Церковь Отдел внешних церковных связей. (DECR).

December in the Eastern Orthodox calendar